is a Japanese footballer currently playing as a left back for Zweigen Kanazawa of J2 League.

Career statistics

Club
.

Notes

References

External links

2000 births
Living people
Japanese footballers
Association football defenders
J2 League players
Kashiwa Reysol players
Zweigen Kanazawa players
Gainare Tottori players